Leipzig-Land is an electoral constituency (German: Wahlkreis) represented in the Bundestag. It elects one member via first-past-the-post voting. Under the current constituency numbering system, it is designated as constituency 154. It is located in northwestern Saxony, comprising the Landkreis Leipzig district.

Leipzig-Land was created for the inaugural 1990 federal election after German reunification. Since 2021, it has been represented by Edgar Naujok of the Alternative for Germany (AfD).

Geography
Leipzig-Land is located in northwestern Saxony. As of the 2021 federal election, it is coterminous with the Landkreis Leipzig district.

History
Leipzig-Land was created after German reunification in 1990, then known as Leipzig-Land – Borna – Geithain. In the 2002 and 2005 elections, it was named Leipziger Land – Muldentalkreis. It acquired its current name in the 2009 election. In the 1990 through 1998 elections, it was constituency 311 in the numbering system. From 2002 through 2009, it was number 155. Since 2013, it has been number 154.

Originally, the constituency comprised the districts of Landkreis Leipzig, Borna, and Geithain. In the 2002 and 2005 elections, it comprised the districts of Leipziger Land and Muldentalkreis. It acquired its current borders in the 2009 election.

Members
The constituency was first represented by Rolf Rau of the Christian Democratic Union (CDU) from 1990 to 1998. Jürgen Wieczorek of the Social Democratic Party (SPD) won it in 1998 and served until 2005. Katharina Landgraf of the CDU was representative from 2005 to 2021. Edgar Naujok won the constituency for the Alternative for Germany (AfD) in 2021.

Election results

2021 election

2017 election

2013 election

2009 election

References

Federal electoral districts in Saxony
1990 establishments in Germany
Constituencies established in 1990
Leipzig (district)